Lucien-Anatole Prévost-Paradol (8 August 1829 – 20 July 1870) was a French journalist and essayist.

Background
Prévost-Paradol was born in Paris, France, conceived through an irregular liaison between the opera singer Lucinde Paradol and the writer Léon Halévy. When Halévy later married Alexandrine Le Bas, his wife agreed to adopt the child, who was then brought up with their own children.

Education and works
Prévost-Paradol was educated at the College Bourbon and entered the École Normale. In 1855 he was appointed professor of French literature at Aix. He held the post barely a year, resigning it to become a leader-writer on the Journal des débats. He also wrote in the Courrier du dimanche, and for a very short time in the Presse.

His chief works are Essais de politique et de littérature (three series, 1859–1866), and Essais sur les moralistes français (1864). He was, however, rather a journalist than a writer of books, and was one of the chief opponents of the empire on the side of moderate liberalism. He underwent the usual difficulties of a journalist under that regime, and was once imprisoned. In 1865 he was elected to the Académie française.

August Strindberg referred to him in his novel The Growth of a Soul:

Opposition and death
The accession of Émile Ollivier to power was fatal to Prévost-Paradol, who apparently believed in the possibility of a liberal empire, and consequently accepted the appointment of envoy to the United States. This was the signal for the most unmeasured attacks on him from the Republican Party. He had scarcely installed himself in his post before the outbreak of the Franco-Prussian War occurred. He shot himself at Washington on 19 July 1870, and later died.

References

External links
 

Members of the Académie Française
Writers from Paris
Suicides by firearm in Washington, D.C.
1829 births
1870 deaths
1870s suicides
Ambassadors of France to the United States
19th-century French journalists
French male journalists
French male writers
French people of German-Jewish descent
French male essayists
19th-century French male writers
19th-century French essayists